Golden Township may refer to one of the following places in the united States:

 Golden Township, Michigan
 Golden Township, Holt County, Nebraska
 Golden Township, Walsh County, North Dakota

Township name disambiguation pages